George William Herbert, 7th Earl of Powis (4 June 1925 – 13 August 1993), was a British peer who sat in the House of Lords between 1988 and 1993.

Family and background
Herbert was born on 4 June 1925. He was the eldest son of the Hon. Elaine Letitia Algitha Orde-Powlett and Rt. Rev. Percy Mark Herbert, Bishop of Norwich, Kingston, and Blackburn who served as Clerk of the Closet. Among his younger siblings (who were granted  the rank of earl's children in 1991) were Hon. David Mark Herbert (chief executive of Studio Vista), Lady Elizabeth Barbarina Herbert (wife of Maj. Hubert Robert Holden of Sibdon Castle, the High Sheriff of Shropshire), and the Hon. Andrew Clive Herbert.

His paternal grandparents were Sybella Augusta Herbert ( Milbank) and Maj.-Gen. The Hon. William Henry Herbert, Mayor of Shrewsbury (and younger son of Edward Herbert, 2nd Earl of Powis and Lucy Herbert, Countess of Powis). His maternal grandparents were William Orde-Powlett, 5th Baron Bolton and Elizabeth  Gibson, a daughter of the 1st Baron Ashbourne).

He was educated at Eton College before attending Trinity College, Cambridge, from where he graduated with a Bachelor of Arts in 1949.

Career
Herbert was appointed a Fellow of the Land Agents' Society. Lord Powis "owned an estate straddling the Welsh border" and "let his cottages in Chirbury at low rents, safeguarding the village school, and led an appeal to restore the parish church."

Upon the death of his bachelor cousin, Christian Herbert (both great-grandchildren of the 2nd Earl), on 7 October 1988, he succeeded as the 7th Earl of Powis, in addition to a number of subsidiary titles including the Baron Clive of Plassey, Baron Clive of Walcot, Baron Herbert of Chirbury, Viscount Clive of Ludlow and the Baron Powis of Powis Castle.

Personal life
On 26 July 1949, Herbert was married to the Hon. Katharine Odeyne de Grey, daughter of Lt.-Col. George de Grey, 8th Baron Walsingham and the former Hyacinth Lambart Bouwens. Together, they lived at Marrington Hall in Chirbury, were the parents of:

 John George Herbert, 8th Earl of Powis (b. 1952), who married Marijke Sofia Guther, daughter of Maarten Nanne Guther, in 1977.
 Hon. Michael Clive Herbert (b. 1954), who married Susan Mary Baker, daughter of Guy Baker, in 1978.
 Hon. Peter James Herbert (b. 1955), who married Terri McBride, daughter of Sean McBride, in 1978.
 Hon. Edward David Herbert (1958–2008), who married Diana Christine Shore, daughter of Cedric Shore, in 1985.
 Lady Lorraine Elizabeth Herbert (b. 1961), who married Roger Samuel Jones in 1981.
 Lady Nicola Wendy Herbert (b. 1962), who married Robert Thomas Buxton in 1985.

After a long illness, Lord Powis died at the Royal Shrewsbury Hospital in Shropshire on 13 August 1993 at age 68.

References

External links

1925 births
1993 deaths
People educated at Eton College
Alumni of Trinity College, Cambridge
Earls of Powis
George